The ox tongue spear (langue de boeuf or langdebeve) was a type of broad-headed double-edged spear that was used in Europe during the 15th and 16th centuries. Some designs had protrusions from the middle or base of the blades, making the head similar in profile to a partisan. Primarily, it was large and heavy, used by infantry in skirmishing.

References 

Spears